Douglas E. Smith (28 October 1960 – 7 September 2014), usually credited as Doug Smith, was an American video game designer and programmer best known as the author of the 8-bit game Lode Runner (1983), considered a seminal work of the 1980s.

Smith, of Renton, Washington, wrote his most famous game while an architecture student at the University of Washington. He wrote the game on a VAX-11/780  in Fortran with some Pascal and assembly over the course of a summer, where it was played by students who provided feedback and levels. It became a "cult hit" on campus. After his nephew asked to play on the Apple II+ he ported it over a 3-day weekend in 6502 assembly language. He borrowed money to purchase a color monitor and joystick and continued to improve the game. Around Christmas of 1982, he submitted the game to four publishers and quickly received offers. He took the deal with Broderbund and the game was published in 1983. It was one of the first games to include a level editor. While the game sold hundreds of thousands of copies in the United States, in Japan it sold millions, becoming the first western video game to become a major success in Japan.

During the 1990s, he was executive producer of the English-language version of Secret of Mana and contributed to the localization of Chrono Trigger. He was the executive producer of Secret of Evermore.

References

External links
 
Douglas E. Smith at MobyGames
Lode Runner in HTML5

1960 births
2014 deaths
Video game designers
Video game artists
Video game producers
Video game programmers